Charles Quinton Brown Jr. (born 1962) is a United States Air Force four-star general who serves as the 22nd chief of staff of the Air Force. He is the first African American to be appointed as chief of staff and the first African American to lead any branch of the United States Armed Forces. Brown assumed office from Gen. David L. Goldfein, who had served as chief of staff since 2016, in a ceremony at Joint Base Andrews on August 6, 2020.

Brown's previous assignments include serving as the commander of Pacific Air Forces, air component commander for United States Indo-Pacific Command, and executive director of the Pacific Air Combat Operations Staff. As the air component commander for CENTCOM, he was responsible for developing contingency plans and conducting air operations in a 20-nation area covering Central and Southwest Asia. Brown also previously served as the deputy commander of United States Central Command (CENTCOM), MacDill Air Force Base, Florida, and prior to that, as commander of Air Forces Central.

In 2020, Brown was named by Time magazine on its list of the 100 most influential people in the world.

Early life and education

Charles Quinton Brown Jr. was born in 1962 to a military family in San Antonio, Texas. Brown was nicknamed "CQ". He had one sister. His father, Charles Q. Brown. Sr, served for 30 years in the Army, rising to the rank of colonel. His paternal grandfather, Robert E. Brown, was drafted in World War II and served in the Pacific Theater in Hawaii and Saipan. 

Brown graduated from Texas Tech University in Lubbock with a Bachelor of Science degree in civil engineering. He joined the Eta Upsilon chapter of Alpha Phi Alpha fraternity. 

Brown was also a distinguished graduate of the Air Force Reserve Officers Training Corps. He was commissioned as a Second Lieutenant after completing this ROTC program and began his formal military career. 

While serving in the Air Force, in 1994, Brown earned a master's degree in aeronautical science from Embry-Riddle Aeronautical University, in Daytona Beach, Florida.

Military career

Brown has served in a variety of positions at the squadron and wing level, including an assignment to the United States Air Force Weapons School as an F-16 instructor. His notable staff tours include aide-de-camp to the Chief of Staff of the Air Force; director, Secretary of the Air Force and Chief of Staff Executive Action Group; and deputy director, operations, U.S. Central Command. He also served as a national defense fellow at the Institute for Defense Analyses, Alexandria, Virginia.

Brown has commanded a fighter squadron, the United States Air Force Weapons School, and two fighter wings. One was the 8th Fighter Wing, which was nicknamed as "Wolf Pack", at Kunsan Air Force Base, South Korea. Prior to his current assignment, he served as director, operations, strategic deterrence, and nuclear integration, Headquarters U.S. Air Forces in Europe—Air Forces Africa, Ramstein Air Base, Germany. He is a command pilot with more than 2,900 flying hours, including 130 combat hours.

Brown's career as a general officer began when he was appointed as commander of the 31st Fighter wing in Aviano Air Force Base, Italy. He was promoted to the rank of brigadier general in June 2009. In May 2013, Brown was promoted to the rank of major general when he was appointed as deputy commander, U.S. Air Forces Central Command, U.S. Central Command. In March 2014 he was appointed as director of operations, strategic deterrence, and nuclear integration of U.S. Air Forces in Europe - Air Forces Africa at Ramstein Air Force Base, Germany.

In June 2015, Brown received his third star when he was appointed as United States Air Forces Central Command (USAFCENT). In July 2016 he was appointed as deputy commander of U.S. Central Command. As AFCENT commander, Brown oversaw all of Air Force operations in the Middle East and Central Asia, while also in-charge as second-in-command of USCENTCOM.

In July 2018, Brown was nominated to succeed General Terrence J. O'Shaughnessy as commander of Pacific Air Forces. O'Shaughnessy was nominated to become commander of the United States Northern Command. Brown was also promoted to four-star general with this position. As PACAF commander, General Brown oversaw all of major United States Air Force operations within the Indo-Pacific region.

Chief of Staff of the Air Force 

On March 2, 2020, the White House announced that President Donald Trump would nominate Brown to become the next Chief of Staff of the United States Air Force, succeeding David L. Goldfein. On June 9, 2020, Brown was unanimously confirmed (98–0) by the United States Senate to succeed Goldfein as Chief of Staff of the US Air Force. With this confirmation he became the first African American to lead a branch of the United States Armed Forces. As Air Force Chief of Staff, he advises the President, Secretary of Defense, and National Security Council regarding Air Force matters.

Tenure
Brown is the most senior uniformed Air Force officer responsible for organizing, training and equipping all of the active-duty Air Force officers, Air National Guard and Air Force Reserve. 

Brown has acted to establish a flexible logistics system in the Air Force's budget for Fiscal year 2021, in order to ensure the Air Force is capable of conducting "expeditionary logistics under attack".

Brown has maintained Goldfein's prioritization of multi-domain command and control following the Air Force Association's 2016 Air, Space & Cyber Conference. Following the establishment of the United States Space Force, which is also part of the Department of the Air Force, Brown worked closely with the first Chief of Space Operations General Jay Raymond. Brown has said that the Space Force will make up much of the Air Force department's "near-term innovation and development". He has emphasized the importance of space superiority and committed to a full collaboration between the Air Force and Space Force.

As Air Force Chief of Staff, Brown began integration of the new tanker aircraft, Boeing KC-46 Pegasus, as part of Air Force fleet rejuvenation, and began its operation within Air Mobility Command. Brown and several Congressional delegation members, including U.S. Senator Jeanne Shaheen, a longtime advocate for the tanker, participated in a demonstration flight at Joint Base Andrews.

General Brown was featured during the 2021 African-American History Month for making history as the first African-American military chief of staff and the first African American who has led any military branch within the United States Armed Forces. General Lloyd Austin, the first African American to serve as a United States Secretary of Defense, was also featured. Brown was made an honorary Tuskegee Airman, receiving the symbolic red jacket in a ceremony on 14 August 2021.

General Brown is considered a strong contender to succeed General Mark Milley as the next Chairman of the Joint Chiefs of Staff.

Education

 1984 Bachelor of Science degree in civil engineering, Texas Tech University, Lubbock
 1991 U.S. Air Force Fighter Weapons School, Nellis Air Force Base, Nevada
 1992 Squadron Officer School, Maxwell AFB, Alabama
 1994 Master of Aeronautical Science degree, Embry-Riddle Aeronautical University, Daytona Beach, Florida
 1997 Distinguished graduate, Air Command and Staff College, Maxwell AFB, Alabama
 2000 Air War College, Maxwell AFB, Alabama
 2004 National Defense Fellow, Institute for Defense Analyses, Alexandria, Virginia
 2008 AF Senior Leadership Course, Center for Creative Leadership, Greensboro, North Carolina
 2012 Joint Force Air Component Commander Course, Maxwell AFB, Alabama
 2014 Joint Flag Officer Warfighting Course, Maxwell AFB, Alabama
 2015 Pinnacle Course, National Defense University, Fort Lesley J. McNair, Washington, D.C.
 2017 Leadership at the Peak, Center for Creative Leadership, Colorado Springs, Colo.

Assignments
 May 1985 – April 1986, student, undergraduate pilot training, 82nd Student Squadron, Williams AFB, Arizona
 May 1986 – July 1986, student, lead-in fighter training, 434th Tactical Fighter Training Squadron, Holloman AFB, New Mexico
 August 1986 – March 1987, student, F-16 training, 62nd Tactical Fighter Training Squadron, MacDill AFB, Florida
 April 1987 – October 1988, F-16 pilot, 35th Tactical Fighter Squadron, Kunsan Air Base, South Korea
 November 1988 – April 1991, F-16 instructor pilot, wing electronic combat officer, and wing standardization and evaluation flight examiner, 307th and 308th Tactical Fighter Squadrons, Homestead AFB, Florida
 April 1991 – August 1991, student, U.S. Air Force Fighter Weapons Instructor Course, Nellis AFB, Nevada
 August 1991 – August 1992, F-16 squadron weapons officer and flight commander of 307th Fighter Squadron, Homestead AFB, Florida
 September 1992 – October 1994, weapons school instructor, and standardization and evaluation flight examiner,  F-16 Division, U.S. Air Force Weapons School, Nellis AFB, Nevada
 October 1994 – July 1996, aide-de-camp to the chief of staff, Headquarters U.S. Air Force, Arlington, Virginia
 August 1996 – June 1997, student, Air Command and Staff College, Maxwell AFB, Alabama
 June 1997 – September 1997, student, Armed Forces Staff College, National Defense University, Norfolk, Virginia
 September 1997 – November 1999, air operations officer, Current Operations Division, Operations Directorate, U.S. Central Command, MacDill AFB, Florida
 November 1999 – June 2003, F-16CJ instructor pilot and assistant operations officer, 79th Fighter Squadron; weapons and training flight commander, 20th Operations Support Squadron; operations officer, 55th Fighter Squadron; and commander of 78th Fighter Squadron, Shaw AFB, South Carolina
 July 2003 – June 2004, National Defense Fellow, Institute for Defense Analyses, Alexandria, Virginia
 June 2004 – June 2005, deputy chief of Program Integration Division, Directorate of Programs, Headquarters U.S. Air Force, Arlington, Virginia
 July 2005 – May 2007, commandant, USAF Weapons School, 57th Wing, Nellis AFB, Nevada
 May 2007 – May 2008, commander, 8th Fighter Wing, Kunsan AB, South Korea
 June 2008 – May 2009, director of Secretary of the Air Force and Chief of Staff Executive Action Group, Headquarters U.S. Air Force, Arlington, Virginia
 June 2009 – April 2011, commander, 31st Fighter Wing, Aviano AB, Italy
 May 2011 – May 2013, deputy director of Operations Directorate, U.S. Central Command, MacDill AFB, Florida
 May 2013 – February 2014, deputy commander of U.S. Air Forces Central Command; deputy, Combined Force Air Component Commander, U.S. Central Command, Southwest Asia
 March 2014 – June 2015, director of operations, strategic deterrence, and nuclear integration, Headquarters U.S. Air Forces in Europe – Air Forces Africa, Ramstein AB, Germany
 June 2015 – July 2016, commander of U.S. Air Forces Central Command; Combined Force Air Component Commander, U.S. Central Command, Southwest Asia
 July 2016 – July 2018, deputy commander of U.S. Central Command, MacDill AFB, Florida
 July 2018 – July 2020, commander of Pacific Air Forces; Air Component Commander for U.S. Indo-Pacific Command; and executive director of Pacific Air Combat Operations Staff, Joint Base Pearl Harbor-Hickam, Hawaii
 August 2020 – present, chief of staff, United States Air Force, Pentagon, Arlington, Virginia

Summary of joint assignments
 September 1997–November 1999, air operations officer, Current Operations Division, Operations Directorate, U.S. Central Command, MacDill Air Force Base, Florida, as a major
 May 2011–May 2013, deputy director of Operations Directorate, U.S. Central Command, MacDill AFB, Florida, as a brigadier general
 July 2016–July 2018, deputy commander of U.S. Central Command, MacDill AFB, Florida, as a lieutenant general
 July 2018–August 2020, commander of Pacific Air Forces; Air Component Commander for U.S. Indo-Pacific Command; and executive director of Pacific Air Combat Operations Staff, Joint Base Pearl Harbor-Hickam, Hawaii, as a general

Flight information

Awards and decorations
Brown has received the following awards and decorations:

Other Recognition
In 2022, Brown received the Golden Plate Award of the American Academy of Achievement.

Effective dates of promotion

References

External links

|-

|-

|-

|-

1962 births
20th-century African-American people
21st-century African-American people
African-American United States Air Force personnel
Chiefs of Staff of the United States Air Force
Embry–Riddle Aeronautical University alumni
Living people
Military personnel from San Antonio
Order of National Security Merit members
Recipients of the Air Force Distinguished Service Medal
Recipients of the Defense Distinguished Service Medal
Recipients of the Defense Superior Service Medal
Recipients of the Legion of Merit
Recipients of the Meritorious Service Medal (United States)
Recipients of the Pingat Jasa Gemilang (Tentera)
Texas Tech University alumni
United States Air Force generals